Kolejówka is a river of Poland, a tributary of the Szotkówka near Mszana.

Rivers of Poland
Rivers of Silesian Voivodeship